National Photography Awards are given to photographers in India. These awards are given in 3 different categories, namely - Lifetime Achievement Award, Professional Photographer of the Year and Amateur Photographer of the Year. It may also include 5 Special Mention Awards in both Professional and Amateur categories.

Award ceremony is organized by Photo Division of Ministry of information and Broadcasting.

Winners

References

Indian awards
Photography awards
Photography in India